Spathiphyllum silvicola is a flowering plant of the genus Spathiphyllum in the family Araceae. It is native to Colombia and Costa Rica.

References

silvicola
Flora of Costa Rica
Flora of Colombia
Plants described in 1976